Hugh Nelson (September 30, 1768March 18, 1836) was an American politician and U.S. Representative from Virginia. He was the son of Thomas Nelson Jr.

Biography
Born in Yorktown in the Colony of Virginia, Nelson graduated from the College of William and Mary, Williamsburg, Virginia, in 1780. He served in the Senate of Virginia 1786–1791, and in the Virginia House of Delegates 1805-1809 and 1828–1829. He was Speaker of the latter house 1807–1809. Nelson also served as judge of the general court.

Nelson was a presidential elector in 1808.

Nelson was elected as a Democratic-Republican to the Twelfth and to the five succeeding Congresses and served from March 4, 1811, until his resignation on January 14, 1823, having received an appointment in the diplomatic service. He served as chairman of the Committee on the Judiciary (Fourteenth, Fifteenth, and Seventeenth Congresses). Nelson was appointed by President James Monroe as United States Minister to Spain on January 15, 1823, and served until November 23, 1824.

Nelson died at his home, "Belvoir," Albemarle County, Virginia, March 18, 1836. He was interred in Belvoir Cemetery, Cismont, Virginia.

References

Sources

1768 births
1836 deaths
Speakers of the Virginia House of Delegates
Nelson family of Virginia
People from Yorktown, Virginia
Ambassadors of the United States to Spain
Virginia state senators
College of William & Mary alumni
19th-century American diplomats
Democratic-Republican Party members of the United States House of Representatives from Virginia
18th-century American politicians
People from Albemarle County, Virginia
1808 United States presidential electors